Kasanje is a location in Central Uganda.

Location
Kasanje is located in Kalungu District, Central Uganda. The coordinates of Kasanje are:00 15 54S, 31 45 54E (Latitude:-0.2650; Longitude:31.7650).

Landmarks
Some of the landmarks near Kasanje include the following:

External links
 Kalungu District Information Portal
Location of Kasanje At Google Maps

See also
Kalungu (Uganda)
Kalungu District
Lake Victoria
Central Region, Uganda
Katonga River
Hospitals in Uganda

References

Kalungu District
Populated places in Central Region, Uganda